Roper House Complex, also known as Camp Oolenoy and Elizabeth Ellison House, is a historic home located near Pickens, Pickens County, South Carolina.  It was built in 1856, and enlarged and remodeled by the Civilian Conservation Corps (CCC) with American Craftsman influences in about 1937. Also on the property are three contributing outbuildings; a smokehouse, garage, and chicken coop. It was the home of Manning Thomas Roper, first superintendent of Table Rock State Park. He also provided the land for both CCC camps and also provided the right-of-way for the original park entrance. In 1952, the Roper House became part of the Table Rock State Park, Camp Oolenoy complex.

It was listed on the National Register of Historic Places in 1989.

References 

Civilian Conservation Corps in South Carolina
Houses on the National Register of Historic Places in South Carolina
Houses completed in 1856
Houses in Pickens County, South Carolina
National Register of Historic Places in Pickens County, South Carolina
1856 establishments in South Carolina